}}
Ngamatapouri is a small rural locality in the Waitōtara River valley, 47 km north of Waitōtara village, in south Taranaki, New Zealand. Wanganui is about 80 km to the southeast. The road is sealed as far as the school.

The New Zealand Ministry for Culture and Heritage gives a translation of "the black teals" for Ngāmatapōuri.

Community life centres on Ngamatapouri School. The area is predominantly reliant on sheep and beef pastoral farming.

Demographics

There were 276 households. There were 402 males and 324 females, giving a sex ratio of 1.24 males per female. The median age was 36.6 years (compared with 37.4 years nationally), with 180 people (24.9%) aged under 15 years, 108 (14.9%) aged 15 to 29, 351 (48.5%) aged 30 to 64, and 81 (11.2%) aged 65 or older.

Ethnicities were 88.0% European/Pākehā, 13.7% Māori, 2.1% Pacific peoples, 4.6% Asian, and 1.7% other ethnicities (totals add to more than 100% since people could identify with multiple ethnicities).

The proportion of people born overseas was 10.4%, compared with 27.1% nationally.

Although some people objected to giving their religion, 47.3% had no religion, 38.2% were Christian, 1.7% were Hindu, 0.4% were Buddhist and 1.7% had other religions.

Of those at least 15 years old, 78 (14.4%) people had a bachelor or higher degree, and 129 (23.8%) people had no formal qualifications. The median income was $34,600, compared with $31,800 nationally. The employment status of those at least 15 was that 324 (59.7%) people were employed full-time, 90 (16.6%) were part-time, and 9 (1.7%) were unemployed.

Education

References

External links

Populated places in Taranaki
South Taranaki District